Beverly Patkotak Grinage is an American academic administrator and community organizer. She was president of Iḷisaġvik College from 2005 to 2010. Grinage is a former executive director of the Alaska Eskimo Whaling Commission and she was a public information officer for the North Slope Borough School District. Grinage has worked as campaign manager and previously was the owner of a of a publishing business. She was the managing editor of the Tundra Times and a member of the Alaska State Council on the Arts.

Career and education 
Grinage was the managing editor of the Tundra Times. In 1988, she was serving as a public information officer for the North Slope Borough School District. In 1989, Grinage worked as a public information specialist, owned a publishing business in Utqiagvik, Alaska, and was appointed by Alaska Governor Steve Cowper to the Alaska State Council on the Arts in 1989 where she continued through 1991. In 1990, she was the campaign manager for Edward Itta, a candidate for mayor of North Slope Borough. She was serving as the executive director of the Alaska Eskimo Whaling Commission in 1991. In 2004, Grinage was a community organizer in Barrow. She is a shareholder of the Arctic Slope Regional Corporation (ASRC) and was a critic of the ASRC management. She organized the group, Shareholders First, to collect signatures at a shareholder meeting due to diminishing dividends. She stated her aim was to help the corporation and the board of directors which will benefit all parties. Grinage succeeded Edna Ahgeak MacLean as president of Iḷisaġvik College in 2005. She was succeeded by Brooke Gondara in 2010. Grinage completed a M.A. at University of Alaska Fairbanks in 2008. Her thesis was titled Inupiat self-determination through higher education.

Personal life 
Grinage is married to Kent Grinage. They have a daughter. She advocates for the use of the Inupiaq language among youth.

See also 

 List of women presidents or chancellors of co-ed colleges and universities

References 

Living people
Year of birth missing (living people)
Place of birth missing (living people)
Inupiat people
Native American academics
American women academics
Native American women academics
Presidents of Iḷisaġvik College
Women heads of universities and colleges
American community activists
American campaign managers
20th-century American businesswomen
20th-century American businesspeople
Female Native American leaders
University of Alaska Fairbanks alumni
Managing editors
Editors of Alaska newspapers
20th-century American newspaper editors
Women newspaper editors
20th-century Native American women
20th-century Native Americans
21st-century Native American women
21st-century Native Americans